"Arrivederci Roma" (English: "Goodbye, Rome") is the title and refrain of a popular Italian song, composed in 1955 by Renato Rascel, with lyrics by Pietro Garinei and Sandro Giovannini.  It was published in 1957 as part of the soundtrack of the Italo-American musical film with the same title, released as Seven Hills of Rome in English.  In the movie, the song is sung by the leading character, played by the American singer and actor Mario Lanza. Carl Sigman wrote the lyrics for the English-language version of the movie.

Another version of the song, with the same melody but a new set of English lyrics by Jack Fishman, was published in 1955 with the title "Arrivederci Darling".  Both versions of the song, in Italian and English, enjoyed lasting and widespread success in the following years.

"Arrivederci Roma" lyrics
Arrivederci (or a rivederci), which literally means "until we see each other again", is a common Italian equivalent of "goodbye".  The original lyrics express the nostalgia of a Roman man for the dinners and short-lived love affairs he had with foreign tourists who came to Rome.  It recalls the popular legend associated with the Trevi Fountain.

Popularity
The recording of "Arrivederci Darling"  by British singer Anne Shelton remained in the UK Singles Chart for four weeks (December 17, 1955, to January 7, 1956, peaking at number 17). Another recording by Edna Savage was in the UK chart for one week (January 14, 1956, at number 19).

Recorded versions
"Arrivederci Roma"

101 Strings Orchestra
The Ames Brothers (1963)
Bing Crosby (1956)
Claudio Villa
Cliff Richard, When in Rome (1965)
Connie Francis
Mario Lanza - Italian and English versions
Dean Martin
Deana Martin, Volare (2009)
Dionne Warwick
Eddie Fisher
Edmundo Ros
Emilio Pericoli
Georgia Gibbs – "Goodbye Rome", B-side of "24 Hours A Day", Mercury 70743 (1955)
Guy Lombardo
Il Volo
James Last
Jerry Vale
Julius LaRosa
Kamahl
Lester Lanin
Luciano Tajoli
Luciano Virgili
Mantovani
Narciso Parigi
Nat King Cole
Percy Faith
Perry Como
Renato Rascel
Richard Clayderman
Roger Williams
Sam Cooke
Sergio Franchi – Our Man from Italy (1963)
Vic Damone
Willis "Gator" Jackson

"Arrivederci Darling"

Anne Shelton (1955)
Edna Savage (1955)
Jo Stafford (1955)
Lys Assia & The Johnston Brothers (1955)
Three Suns (1955)
Francisco Cavez and his orchestra (1956)

References

Italian songs
1955 songs
Songs about Rome
Songs about parting
Songs written by Carl Sigman
Mario Lanza songs
Songs with music by Renato Rascel
Dionne Warwick songs
1950s ballads